John Hope, 2nd Earl of Hopetoun (7 September 1704 – 12 February 1781) was the son of Charles Hope, 1st Earl of Hopetoun and Lady Henrietta Johnstone.

He married on 14 September 1733 to Anne Ogilvy, daughter of James Ogilvy, 5th Earl of Findlater (son of James Ogilvy, 4th Earl of Findlater) and Lady Elizabeth Hay. He married, secondly, Jane Oliphant (died 16 March 1767), daughter of Robert Oliphant, on 30 October 1762. He married, thirdly, Lady Elizabeth Leslie (died 10 April 1788), daughter of Alexander Melville, 5th Earl of Leven and Elizabeth Monypenny, on 10 June 1767.

John Hope succeeded to the title of 2nd Earl of Hopetoun in 1742.
In 1747 he was appointed Curator bonis (Trustee in Lunacy) for his half-uncle, the 4th Earl of Annandale and Hartfell.

Children by first marriage to Lady Anne Ogilvy include
 Elizabeth Hope (born 1739 – died 7 April 1756)
 James Hope-Johnstone, 3rd Earl of Hopetoun (born 23 August 1741 – died 29 May 1817)
 Lady Henrietta Hope (1750?–1786).
 Sophia Hope (born 1759 – died 8 March 1813)

Children by second marriage to Jane Oliphant
 Lady Anne Hope (1763–1780)
 Jane Hope (died 9 June 1829)
 General John Hope, 4th Earl of Hopetoun (born 17 August 1765 – died 27 August 1823)
 Jean Hope

Children from third marriage to Lady Elizabeth Leslie
Lady Elizabeth (Betty) was the sister of David Leslie, 6th Earl of Leven.

 General Charles Hope (born 16 October 1768 – died 1 July 1828)
 General Sir Alexander Hope (born 2 December 1769 – died 19 May 1837)
 Lady Charlotte Hope (born 1778 – died 22 January 1834) (married her cousin, Charles Hope, Lord Granton)
 Lady Mary Anne Hope (died 21 February 1838) (married Patrick Murray of Ochtertyre)

References

 Charles Mosley, editor, Burke's Peerage and Baronetage, 106th edition, 2 volumes (Crans, Switzerland: Burke's Peerage (Genealogical Books) Ltd., 1999), volume 1, page 81.

External links
Peerage

Earls of Hopetoun
1704 births
1781 deaths
John
Lords High Commissioner to the General Assembly of the Church of Scotland
Place of birth missing
Place of death missing
Fellows of the Royal Society
18th-century Scottish people
Freemasons of the Premier Grand Lodge of England